Erlend Øye (born 21 November 1975) is a Norwegian composer, musician, producer, singer and songwriter from Bergen, best known for being one half of the indie folk duo Kings of Convenience, along with Eirik Glambek Bøe. Among other musical projects he is front-man for the band The Whitest Boy Alive, and has contributed to tracks by electronic music artists such as Dntel and Norwegian duo Röyksopp. He is also the co-founder of the independent label Bubbles Records. Since 2012 he has lived in Sicily and played extensively with trio La Comitiva.  

In addition to his native Norwegian, he also speaks English and some Italian.

Biography

Bergen
Erlend Øye was born on 21 November 1975 in Bergen, his parents met in 1974 in a demonstration in support of the victims of the 1973 Chilean coup d'état against Salvador Allende that took place in Bergen, at which time his father read a poem, which allowed him to meet Øye's mother. Having grown up listening to Leonard Cohen, Nick Drake, Suzanne Vega and The Smiths, during high school in the early-mid 1990s, he and some of his friends formed the band Skog ("forest" in Norwegian), taking inspiration from the famous song "A Forest" by The Cure. In 1996 he joined the band Peachfuzz as electric guitarist, playing several times in London between 1996 and 1998.

In 2008 he started to collaborate on a project with Mikal Telle of Tellé Records and they created the independent label Opplett with the aim of producing young talent from Bergen and the surrounding area. The label Opplett published three projects: the album Opplett 2008 that contains seven songs by seven different artists (as Lars Vaular, John Olav Nilsen & Gjengen and Razika, 2008); the first single of Indie rock band Razika called Love is All About the Timing; and the first album of the band Fjorden Baby!.

London
In 1998 he moved to London and then in 1999 to Manchester. 
When he was back home in Bergen for vacations he jammed with Eirik Glambek Bøe, his former high school and Skog mate. The duo formed Kings of Convenience in 1998 and released the debut record, Quiet is the New Loud, in 2001.

Berlin
In the same period, he collaborated with the electronic Norwegian duo Röyksopp, lending his voice for the song "Poor Leno" and "Remind Me" on the record Melody A.M.. As a result, he became interested in electronic music and spent the next years in Berlin from 2002 to 2006 or travelling around the world, recording his solo album Unrest in ten different cities with ten different electronic artists. He toured as a DJ, singing along with the records that he played and released a remix record for the DJ Kicks series in 2004. In the same year, Kings of Convenience released the second record Riot on an Empty Street. Meanwhile, he founded another project in Berlin, The Whitest Boy Alive. The band originally started as an electronic band, but slowly developed into a band with no electronic elements, releasing the debut record Dreams in 2006, while the latest record entitled Rules was released in 2009. Both the records were released by Bubbles Records, the independent label founded by Erlend Øye and Marcin Öz in 2006. 
In 2006, he appeared in the Italian movie Shooting Silvio acting as DJ during a house party. In 2009, Kings of Convenience released the third record Declaration of Dependence. In 2011 and 2013, he produced the records Hest and Six months is a long time by fellow Bergen band Kakkmaddafakka.

Sicily
In 2012, during a small concert organized in a vernissage in Ortigia in Sicily, he publicly stated that he had bought a house in the city of Syracuse to move there with his mother. In 2013, he released a new single, entitled La Prima Estate, sung in Italian and inspired by his time living in Italy, which is accompanied by a videoclip shot in Syracuse. He is currently working on more songs in Italian, which will be made into an album. In 2014, The Whitest Boy Alive announced the end of the project. On 3 October 2014, he released his second solo album Legao, recorded in Reykjavík with Hjálmar, a reggae group from Iceland, which was anticipated by the single Garota with a videoclip shot in Seoul. Despite currently living in Sicily, he is still involved in the Bergen music scene, promoting local bands and assisting the organization of the annual Traena Music Festival.

Chile 
On numerous occasions Øye has visited Chile. His first presentation was in 2006, during his tour in South America. In 2017 he traveled to Chile to spend a season at the home of a close friend who lived in Santiago, where he mainly dedicated himself to composing songs on the ukulele. After playing at the "En Orbita" Festival, he met Tiare Galaz (a member of the Chilean band Niña Tormenta), who also played the ukulele. After talking with Tiare backstage, they agreed to meet another day to share their experiences on the instrument. After being invited to dinner the next day by Tiare, he met Diego Lorenzini, who brought him a chord notebook. Some time later, he was invited to a series of concerts of the Matiné Uva Robot, where he met musicians Rosario Alfonso and Javier Bobbert. In an interview with CNN Chile, he said "from that moment on we started to play regularly while I was in Chile. It was very surprising to see how the musical search of these four Chileans was very similar to what I was doing with the support band that I had formed with three Sicilian friends - called La Comitiva -, so I finally decided to invite them to open my tour of Germany together". Chilean artists were invited to a tour with Øye through Europe, where he established a great friendship with Chilean musicians. During the summer of 2018, he returned to Chile to accompany the Swedish-Argentine singer-songwriter José González, and later accompanied Niña Tormenta, Diego Lorenizi and the band Salanca Selector at an outdoor concert in the Chilean town of Pirque.  In 2019 Øye collaborated with Diego Lorenzini in his song Me voy a Valparaíso from his album De algo hay que morir (UVA Robot, 2019). In late 2019, The Whitest Boy Alive announced a new series of performances in Chile and Argentina and in 2020 released the non-album single Serious, the project's first new material since 2009's Rules.

Mexico 
In the beginning of 2020, due to the Covid-19 pandemic, Øye found himself stranded in San Jose del Cabo, Mexico. In a hotel that came equipped with a recording studio, Øye and Sebastian Maschat, the drummer of Whitest Boy Alive, recorded the album Quarantine At El Ganzo.

Discography

Albums

Singles

EPs

Collaborations and Guest appearances

Other work 
 2004 – Bart Davenport – Live at the Chabot House (A&R, artwork, recording)
 2006 – Berardo Carboni – Shooting Silvio (film) (Cameo role as DJ)
 2008 – Various Artists – Opplett 2008 (Producer)
 2011 – Kakkmaddafakka – Hest (Producer)
 2013 – Kakkmaddafakka – Six months is a long time (Producer)
 2013 – Kakkmaddafakka – Someone New (Music video co-directed with Marcin Öz)

Covers 

Erlend Øye often performs significantly reworked versions of other bands' songs during his concerts, which is reflected in the vocal interludes on his mixtape album DJ-KiCKS: Erlend Øye. Among his most-played covers are:
 Thirteen by Big Star
 Blowin' in the Wind and Don't Think Twice, It's All Right by Bob Dylan
 Redemption Song by Bob Marley
 E la chiamano estate by Bruno Martino
 Brothers in Arms by Dire Straits
 Dreams by Fleetwood Mac
 Sapore di sale by Gino Paoli
 Til þín by Hjálmar
 Una ragazza in due by I Giganti
 These Days by Jackson Browne
 Tram No. 7 to Heaven by Jens Lekman
 Happy Xmas and Jealous Guy by John Lennon
 No Train To Stockholm by Lee Hazlewood
 E la luna bussò by Loredana Bertè
 Grande grande grande by Mina
 Wonderwall by Oasis
 You Can Call Me Al by Paul Simon
 Se a vida é by Pet Shop Boys
 Wish You Were Here by Pink Floyd
 Ignition by R. Kelly
 (They Long to Be) Close to You by Richard Chamberlain
 Norwegian Wood by The Beatles
 Ask, Heaven Knows I'm Miserable Now
 Please, Please, Please, Let Me Get What I Want and There Is a Light That Never Goes Out by The Smiths
 Boys Don't Cry by The Cure
 Last Christmas by Wham!

Bands 

 1995–1997 – Skog
 1996–1998 – Peachfuzz
 1999–present – Kings of Convenience
 2003–present – solo work
 2003–2014 / 2019-present – The Whitest Boy Alive
 201?–present – work with La Comitiva

References

External links 
 Erlend Øye (Official WebSite)
 Kings of Convenience (Official WebSite)

1975 births
Living people
Astralwerks artists
Norwegian electronic musicians
Norwegian DJs
Norwegian musicians
Norwegian record producers
Synth-pop singers
Electronic dance music DJs
English-language singers from Norway
Spanish-language singers of Norway